The Alsace class was a pair of fast battleships planned by the French Navy in the late 1930s in response to German plans to build two H-class battleships after the Second London Naval Treaty collapsed. The proposed armament included nine or twelve  guns or nine  guns, but no choice was definitively made before the program ended in mid-1940. According to one pair of historians, logistical considerations—including the size of the 12-gun variant and the introduction of a new shell caliber for the 406 mm version—led the naval command to settle on the nine 380 mm design. But another pair of authors disagree, believing that the difficulty of designing and manufacturing a three-gun turret would have caused prohibitive delays during wartime, making the third, largest variant the most likely to have been built. The ships would have forced the French government to make significant improvements to its harbor and shipyard facilities, as the smaller Richelieus already stretched the limitations of existing shipyards. With construction of the first member of the class scheduled for 1941, the plan was terminated by the German victory in the Battle of France in May–June 1940.

Background and development

France, the United Kingdom, and the United States signed the Second London Naval Treaty in 1936, though Japan and Italy both refused to do so, which effectively ended the international naval arms control regime begun with the Washington Naval Treaty of 1922. After Japan withdrew from the conference on 15 January 1937 and refused to return, the United States invoked the clause on 31 March.

The work to improve French shipyards and harbor facilities would have significantly increased the cost of building battleships up to the treaty maximum. The command assumed that only Japan and the United States would be interested in building 45,000-ton ships and so announced that it would respect the 35,000-ton limit so long as other European navies did the same. French plans were disrupted in mid-1939 when French military intelligence became aware that the German Kriegsmarine (War Navy) had begun construction of two H-class battleships in accordance with Plan Z; these were  ships, though French intelligence initially believed them to be only  vessels. This development led Vice-Amiral (Vice Admiral) François Darlan, the Chief of Staff of the French Navy, to order design studies for new battleships that exceeded the 35,000-ton limit.

Infrastructure concerns
In the late 1930s, there were only three existing slipways capable of building large ships: The No. 4 dock at Brest and the Forme Caquot and No. 1 docks in Saint-Nazaire. The No. 4 dock was only , too short to build any vessel larger than the Richelieus (which themselves had to be built without their bow or stern and completed after launching), and the No. 1 dock in Saint-Nazaire was already occupied with building the aircraft carrier  (and was slated to begin construction of her sister  after the latter's projected launch in 1941).

To build battleships to compete with the German H-class vessels, the French Navy would need to embark on a major program to improve its infrastructure. Dock No. 10 was slated to be completed by 1942, at which point work on the graving dock would begin, as budgetary limitations and a shortage of skilled workers prevented both facilities from being built at the same time. At a later date, Dock No. 10 was to be lengthened to 360 m as well.

In addition to shipbuilding facilities, the new battleships would necessitate improved repair and harbor facilities at the various major naval bases. Port facilities had already been built or were in the process of construction at Cherbourg, Toulon, Casablanca, Bizerte, and Dakar, though dry-docks in those ports were not sufficient to handle even a Richelieu in a damaged condition (where flooding would increase draft to more than ). It was estimated that these docks would need to be dredged to at least  to accommodate the Alsace design. The navy had to acquire other equipment, including the tugboats necessary to maneuver the ships in port and floating cranes needed to fit out the vessels, but shortages in machinery slowed construction and owing to the outbreak of World War II in September 1939, France was unable to order the vessels from neutral countries.

Design proposals 
Design work began in late 1939; three versions were prepared, all of which were developments of the Project C type that was created during the design process for the Clemenceau and Gascogne variants of the Richelieu class. Unlike the standard Richelieu type that mounted all eight of their main battery guns in a pair of four-gun turrets forward, the Project C design adopted an arrangement with two three-gun turrets forward and one triple turret aft. The first was the same figure proposed for the British s and that incorrectly assumed for the German H-class ships, the third was the maximum under the agreement reached with Britain and the United States, and the second was a compromise displacement figured to be the minimum that could accommodate the mandated top speed of at least  along with a battery of 406 mm guns.

The first proposal for Alsace, No. 1, was essentially a slightly enlarged version of Project C. The ship had a longer hull, which required a  increase in horsepower while incurring a loss of one knot in top speed. No. 2 was a scaled up version of No. 1, with the 380 mm guns replaced with 406 mm guns. The No. 3 type was enlarged further to accommodate three quadruple 380 mm turrets, though it managed to increase speed by a knot.

Darlan and the rest of the naval command evaluated the design proposals, but the choice was obvious from the start according to the historians John Jordan and Robert Dumas. No. 2, armed with 406 mm guns, would have introduced a fourth caliber to the French battle line (after the 380 mm guns of the Richelieus, the  guns of the s, and the  guns of the older s). Additionally, the 406 mm gun had not yet been produced, so the necessary design work might have delayed completion of the new ships. The No. 3 type was simply too large for existing naval bases to easily accommodate. This left No. 1 as the only realistic option for the next battleship program. Historians William Garzke and Robert Dulin disagree, however, pointing out that the French Navy had never built a three-gun turret before. Building the ships under wartime constraints (and with the need to produce the ship as quickly as possible), repeating the four-gun turrets of the Richelieus made the most sense, and they argue that the No. 3 design was the most likely version to be built.

They estimate that the projected battery of twenty-four 100 mm guns would have been cut in half, in line with the other variants, and eighteen 37 mm guns would have been carried.

Two of the new ships were authorized on 1 April 1940. The first vessel was slated to be laid down at the No. 1 slipway at Saint-Nazaire after Joffre was to be launched in 1941, displacing Painlevé, which was not reallocated to another builder before the program ended. The second member of the class was to be laid down in 1942 in the new No. 10 dock in Brest, which was to have been completed by that time. On 15 May 1940, the navy proposed four names for the first two ships for Darlan to select; these were Alsace, Normandie, Flandre, and Bourgogne. According to Garzke and Dulin, the government considered authorizing two more vessels, though no contracts were placed. Initial orders for building material were scheduled for mid-1940, but following the German victory in the Battle of France by June, all French naval construction programs came to an end.

Citations

References 

 
 
 

Battleship classes
Battleships of the French Navy
Proposed ships
Abandoned military projects of France
Ship classes of the French Navy